The Lexicon of Comicana is a 1980 book by the American cartoonist Mort Walker. It was intended as a tongue-in-cheek look at the devices used by comics cartoonists. In it, Walker invented an international set of symbols called symbolia after researching cartoons around the world (described by the term comicana). In 1964, Walker had written an article called "Let's Get Down to Grawlixes", a satirical piece for the National Cartoonists Society. He used terms such as grawlixes for his own amusement, but they soon began to catch on and acquired an unexpected validity. The Lexicon was written in response to this.

The names he invented for them sometimes appear in dictionaries, and serve as convenient terminology occasionally used by cartoonists and critics. A 2001 gallery showing of comic- and street-influenced art in San Francisco, for example, was called "Plewds! Squeans! and Spurls!"

Examples
Agitrons: wiggly lines around a shaking object or character.
Blurgits, swalloops: curved lines preceding or trailing after a character's moving limbs.
Briffits (💨): clouds of dust that hang in the wake of a swiftly departing character or object.
Dites, hites and vites: straight lines drawn across flat, clear and reflective surfaces, such as windows and mirrors. The first letter indicates direction: diagonal, horizontal and vertical respectively. Hites may also be used trailing after something moving with great speed.
Emanata: lines drawn around the head to indicate shock or surprise
Grawlixes (#, $, *, @): typographical symbols standing in for profanities, appearing in dialogue balloons in place of actual dialogue.
Indotherm (♨): wavy, rising lines used to represent steam or heat.
Lucaflect: a shiny spot on a surface of something, depicted as a four-paned window shape.
Plewds (💦): flying sweat droplets that appear around a character's head when working hard, stressed, etc.
Quimps (🪐): A special example of the grawlix, a symbol resembling the planet Saturn.
Solrads: radiating lines drawn from something luminous like a lightbulb or the sun.
Squeans (💫): little starbursts or circles that signify intoxication, dizziness, or sickness.
Additional symbolia terms include whiteope, sphericasia, that-a-tron, spurls, oculama, crottles, maledicta balloons, farkles, doozex, staggeratron, boozex, digitrons, nittles, waftaroms, and jarns.

See also
 Cartoon physics
 Glossary of comics terminology
 Manga iconography
 Sniglet

References

Bibliography
 Steve Edgell, Tim Pilcher, Brad Brooks, The Complete Cartooning Course: Principles, Practices, Techniques (London: Barron's, 2001), pp. 50–51,

External links
 

1980 books
Books about comics
Cartooning
Comics terminology
Constructed languages
Linguistics books
Symbolism
Symbols